The Dartmouth Big Green women's lacrosse team is an NCAA Division I college lacrosse team representing Dartmouth College as part of the Ivy League. They play their home games at Scully-Fahey Field in Hanover, New Hampshire.

Historical statistics
*Statistics through 2018 season

Individual career records

Reference:

Individual single-season records

Seasons
References:

Postseason Results

The Big Green have appeared in 14 NCAA tournaments. Their postseason record is 11–14.

References

Ivy League women's lacrosse
lac